The Forest and Landscape College (Danish: Skovskolen), now part of University of Copenhagen (UCPH), is located in Nødebo in the southern part of Grib Forest, Hillerød Municipality, some 30 km north of Copenhagen, Denmark. Originally an independent institution, it was merged with UCPH in 2007 and is now part of its  Department of Geosciences and Natural Resource Management.

History
The school traves its history back to the foundation of Skovarbejderskolen  at Kagerup in 1948. It offered a four-week programme where mostly experienced forest workers were trained in the use of machine saws and other modern technology. The school burned in 1953,

Skovskolen in Nødebo was established in 1963 as a merger between Skovarbejderskolen and three forester schools. Most of its current buildings were built in 1982–83 to design by royal building inspector Gehrdt Bornebusch. It was expanded in 1983 og 1995-96.

Campus

The Forest and Landscape College occupies a village-like campus of low, black-painted buildings on the northern outskirts of Nødebo. A new building designed by Rørbæk & Møller Arkitekter is expected to be completed in 2016 and will be followed by a new residential building.

The campus area also comprises Nødebo's old forester's residence. It dates from about 1800 and was listed in 1960.

Public facilities and events
The students have built various public facilities in the area, including shelters, free cabins and a nature playground. They also arrange various events, including Skovens Dag (The Forrest's Day) and an annual Christmas market.

References

External links
 Official website

University of Copenhagen
Buildings and structures in Hillerød Municipality
Educational institutions established in 1963
1963 establishments in Denmark